The Marrakesh Declaration is a statement made in January 2016 by "more than 250 Muslim religious leaders, heads of state, and scholars", which champions "defending the rights of religious minorities in predominantly Muslim countries." The declaration was made in Morocco and "representatives of persecuted religious communities — including Chaldean Catholics from Iraq" were included in the conference. The conference, in which the Marrakesh Declaration was signed, was called in response to the persecution of religious minorities, such as Christians and Yazidis, by ISIS. The Marrakesh Declaration builds on historical Islamic sources such as the Charter of Medina. King Mohammed VI of Morocco stated "We in the kingdom of Morocco will not tolerate the violation of the rights of religious minorities in the name of Islam...I am enabling Christians and Jews to practice their faith and not just as minorities. They even serve in the government."

Responses
The declaration has been widely welcomed. Some commentators called for consistent legal and practical follow through of the sentiments expressed including in the country where the declaration was forged, which does not recognise its own indigenous Christians and persecutes and imprisons them, or in the birthplace of Islam, where there are reportedly many Saudi Christians.

See also 

Ashtiname of Muhammad
Human rights in Islamic countries

References

External links 
Marrakesh Declaration



Freedom of religion